This is a list of the highest gross puppet films. Puppet films feature puppets as lead characters. Stop motion films are not included.

Highest grossing puppet films

See also
 List of highest grossing films
 Lists of highest-grossing films
 List of live-action puppet films

References

External links
 Puppet movies on IMDb

Puppet